The 1923 Furman Purple Hurricane football team represented the Furman University as a member of the Southern Intercollegiate Athletic Association (SIAA) during the 1923 college football season. Led by ninth-year head coach Billy Laval, the Purple Hurricane compiled an overall record of 9–2 with a mark of 4–1 in conference play, winning the SIAA title for the second consecutive season. Blackie Carter was the team captain.

Schedule

References

Furman
Furman Paladins football seasons
Furman Purple Hurricane football